"Tootsee Roll" is a song by rap group 69 Boyz released as the first single from their debut album 199Quad. In the United States, the song sold one million copies and earned a platinum certification from the Recording Industry Association of America. It reached number eight on the Billboard Hot 100 chart in early January 1995, number nine on Hot R&B Singles and number one on Hot Rap Singles. "Tootsee Roll" took 27 weeks to hit its Hot 100 peak of number 8, spending the previous four months in the top 20 before finally reaching its peak.

Charts

Weekly charts

Year-end charts

References

1994 debut singles
Southern hip hop songs
Miami bass songs
1994 songs